Formoso is a city in Jewell County, Kansas, United States.  As of the 2020 census, the population of the city was 94.

History
The first post office at Formoso was established in December 1887.

Formoso was founded about 1889.

Geography
Formoso is located at  (39.779355, -97.992458).

Demographics

2010 census
As of the census of 2010, there were 93 people, 48 households, and 26 families living in the city. The racial makeup of the city was 98.9% White and 1.1% from two or more races. Hispanic or Latino of any race were 1.1% of the population.

There were 48 households, of which 14.6% had children under the age of 18 living with them, 39.6% were married couples living together, 8.3% had a female householder with no husband present, 6.3% had a male householder with no wife present, and 45.8% were non-families. 41.7% of all households were made up of individuals, and 20.8% had someone living alone who was 65 years of age or older. The average household size was 1.94 and the average family size was 2.54.

The median age in the city was 56.5 years. 18.3% of residents were under the age of 18; 2.3% were between the ages of 18 and 24; 14% were from 25 to 44; 28% were from 45 to 64; and 37.6% were 65 years of age or older. The gender makeup of the city was 55.9% male and 44.1% female.

2000 census
As of the census of 2000, there were 129 people, 68 households, and 35 families living in the city. The racial makeup of the city was 99.22% White and 0.78% Pacific Islander. Hispanic or Latino of any race were 1.55% of the population.

There were 68 households, out of which 16.2% had children under the age of 18 living with them, 48.5% were married couples living together, 4.4% had a female householder with no husband present, and 47.1% were non-families. 45.6% of all households were made up of individuals, and 29.4% had someone living alone who was 65 years of age or older. The average household size was 1.90 and the average family size was 2.64.

In the city, the population was spread out, with 15.5% under the age of 18, 3.9% from 18 to 24, 20.9% from 25 to 44, 34.1% from 45 to 64, and 25.6% who were 65 years of age or older. The median age was 53 years. For every 100 females, there were 101.6 males. For every 100 females age 18 and over, there were 98.2 males.

The median income for a household in the city was $22,500, and the median income for a family was $33,958. Males had a median income of $31,458 versus $14,688 for females. The per capita income for the city was $14,509. There were 6.9% of families and 11.6% of the population living below the poverty line, including no under eighteens and 18.8% of those over 64.

Education
The community is served by Rock Hills USD 107 public school district. It was formed in 2006 by the consolidation of White Rock USD 104 and Mankato USD 278.  The Rock Hills High School mascot is Rock Hills Grizzlies.

Formoso schools closed through school unification. The Formoso High School mascot was Formoso Falcons.

Notable people
 John Mills Houston, politician

References

Further reading

External links
 Formoso - Directory of Public Officials
 Formoso city map, KDOT

Cities in Kansas
Cities in Jewell County, Kansas